Alex Kakuba (born 12 June 1991) is a Ugandan professional footballer who currently plays for C.D. Cova da Piedade.

Club career
Kakuba began his professional career at Proline FC. He left Proline FC in the summer of 2012, transferring on a free to the Portuguese fourth-tier side Esperança Lagos. In January 2013, he joined the second-tier outfit Covilhã, making 50 league appearances for two seasons. On 14 June 2014, Kakuba moved to the Estoril Praia in the top-flight Primeira Liga, signing a four-year deal.

Kakuba signed for 2 years for PAS Giannina in July 2018. He released on a free transfer on 10 December 2018.

On 27 March 2019, Kakuba signed for Lori FC. In June 2019, he then joined Portuguese club C.D. Cova da Piedade.

References

External links
 
 
 

1991 births
Living people
Sportspeople from Kampala
Ugandan footballers
Uganda international footballers
Ugandan expatriate footballers
Primeira Liga players
Liga Portugal 2 players
Armenian Premier League players
S.C. Covilhã players
G.D. Estoril Praia players
C.D. Feirense players
PAS Giannina F.C. players
FC Lori players
C.D. Cova da Piedade players
Expatriate footballers in Portugal
Ugandan expatriate sportspeople in Portugal
Expatriate footballers in Armenia
Ugandan expatriate sportspeople in Armenia
Association football defenders